Technology companies in the New York City metropolitan area represent a significant and growing economic component of the New York metropolitan area, the most populous combined statistical area in the United States and one of the most populous urban agglomerations in the world. In the region's Silicon Alley, new establishments include those of Israeli companies in New York City, at a rate of ten new startups per month, and the technology sector has been claiming a greater share of New York City's economy since 2010. Tech:NYC, founded in 2016, is a nonprofit organization which represents New York City's technology industry with government, civic institutions, in business, and in the media and whose primary goals are to attract tech talent to the city and to advocate for policies that will help tech companies grow.

The following is a partial and growing list of notable New York metropolitan area tech companies:

Apps
FanDuel
 Trello

Artificial intelligence
Enigma Technologies
 IBM Watson

Cloud and database services
 MongoDB
BetterCloud
 IBM 
 KeyMe
 LiveTiles
SimpleReach
SocialFlow
Zeta Global

Digital media
33Across
AppNexus
Arkadium
Behance
DoubleClick
Innovid
Invite Media
JW Player
Kaltura
Mic
 SoundCloud
 Spotify
Squarespace
Stack Exchange
Taboola
Vimeo
Zola Books

Financial technology (Fintech)

 Betterment
 Bloomberg L.P.
E-Trade
 Finco Services Inc
 SeedInvest
 Stash (company)
 Two Sigma

Hardware
 HTC
 Huawei
 IBM
 LG Electronics
 Nokia Bell Labs
 Samsung Electronics
 TCL Corporation
 ZTE
 Latch

Health services technology
Oscar Health
Phreesia
 Zocdoc

Life insurance
 Haven Life

Software
 Animoto
 Appetizer Mobile
 Atavist
 Barnes & Noble
 CA Technologies
 Cockroach Labs
 Cognizant
 ConsenSys
 Datadog
 Deeplink
 DigitalOcean
 Enterproid
 Glitch
 Greenhouse Software
 Helix Software Company
 Impelsys
 Infor
 letgo
 LivePerson
 Mediaocean
 MongoDB
 Oscar Health
 Paribus
 Q-Sensei
 Safefood 360°
 Telmar (company)
 Videology
 Yext

Software as a service (SaaS) 

Diligent
Medidata Solutions

Other services

 Andela
Birchbox
Blue Apron
 ButterflyMX
 Cambridge Analytica
CARTO
ClassPass
 Etsy
Foursquare
Gilt Groupe
Integral Ad Science
 Jet.com
 Kickstarter
littleBits
Mimeo, Inc 
OkCupid
Paddle8
Panjiva
 Rent the Runway
 Seamless
SeatGeek
Shapeways
Sharp Electronics Corporation USA
 ShopKeep
Shutterstock
Skillshare
Squarefoot
Peloton

See also

List of biotech and pharmaceutical companies in the New York metropolitan area
 List of companies based in New York City
 Silicon Alley
Silicon Hills
 Tech Valley

References 

New York
Software companies based in New York City
 
 
New York City-related lists
Economy of the New York metropolitan area